The Journal of Policing, Intelligence and Counter Terrorism (JPICT) is an international peer-reviewed academic journal covering policing, intelligence and counterterrorism published by Taylor and Francis, Routledge.

The Journal of Policing, Intelligence and Counter Terrorism is a forum for international experts in policing studies, intelligence studies and terrorism and counter terrorism studies. JPICT provides regional, national and international perspectives on current security issues. It also provides a forum for researchers and practitioners to discuss areas of applied knowledge.

The Journal of Policing, Intelligence and Counter Terrorism aims to present cutting-edge research on contemporary security issues and debates, and publish articles that explore the interplay between policing, intelligence and counter terrorism. The Journal also acts as an international forum for debate on theoretical and applied issues, and examines the connection between the theoretical study of contemporary security issues and their practical application.

The Journal of Policing, Intelligence and Counter Terrorism publishes articles that provide practical policy proscriptions as well as theoretical insights. It is also unique in its inclusion of practitioner perspectives on policing, intelligence and counter terrorism issues.

The Journal of Policing, Intelligence and Counter Terrorism publishes one special issue every year. Notable special issues include:

 Special Issue - Volume 14, Issue 3: After Christchurch - Global Perspectives on Far-Right Terrorism 
 Special Issue - Volume 16, Issue 1: Navigating the Divide - Cooperation Between Academics and National Security Practitioners

Aims and Scope 
The Journal of Policing, Intelligence and Counter Terrorism (JPICT) provides a global platform for professional research connected to policing, intelligence, and terrorism studies, and the complex relationships between each field. JPICT requires authentic theoretical and conceptual perspectives and insights, in combination with current empirical research relating to relevant and contemporary security issues. Published research stems from multi-disciplined approaches that target the creation of unity between academic and practitioner fields.

The Journal gives exclusive priority to research that critiques and evaluates the professional and practical aspects of policing, intelligence, and counter terrorism, and explores the complexities of the working relationship between each area of expertise. Valued contributions may target a specific issue, provide detailed empirical research, may combine original research with practical applications, and may involve the professional knowledge of practitioners and policymakers. The interactive Forum section allows for informed debate and innovative perspectives to be shared in a professional setting. 

The Journal creates an indispensable and informative addition to the professional library of academics, practitioners and policymakers engaging with policing, intelligence, and terrorism and counter-terrorism.

Editorial Board 
Editor-In-Chief

Associate Professor Julian Droogan - Macquarie University, Australia

Managing Editor

Dr Nell Bennett - Macquarie University, Australia 

Editorial Board

Professor Debi Ashenden -  University of Adelaide, Australia

Associate Professor Daniel Baldino -  University of Notre Dame, Australia

Professor Adrian Cherney -  University of Queensland, Australia

Associate Professor Erik J Dahl -  Naval Postgraduate School, USA

Professor Michele Grossman -  Deakin University, Australia

Professor Rohan Gunaratna -  Nanyang Technology University, Singapore

Dr Victoria Herrington -  Australian Institute of Police Management, Australia

Professor Christian Kaunert  - Dublin City University, Ireland; University of South Wales, UK

Associate Professor Khurram Iqbal -  National Defence University, Pakistan

Distinguished University Professor Arie Kruglanski -  University of Maryland, USA

Associate Professor David Malet - American University, USA

Associate Professor Jonathan Matusitz -  University of Central Florida, USA

Professor Kristina Murphy - Griffith University, Australia

Senior Lecturer Nick Nelson -  Centre for Defence and Security Studies, New Zealand

Associate Professor Kumar Ramakrishna -  Nanyang Technological University, Singapore

Professor James Ramsay -  University of New Hampshire, USA

Dr Ryan Shaffer -  independent scholar, USA

Professor Debra Smith -  Victoria University, Australia

Dr David Strachan-Morris -  University of Leicester, UK

Lecturer Lise Waldek -  Macquarie University, Australia

Andrew Zammit -  Victoria University, Australia

Journal Office

Department of Security Studies and Criminology, Faculty of Arts

Level 5, Arts Precinct, 25B, Wally's Walk,

Macquarie University, NSW 2109, Australia

References

External links 
 

Publications established in 2006
English-language journals
Political science journals
Non-fiction works about espionage